The Canton of La Jarrie is a canton of the Charente-Maritime department, in France. Since the French canton reorganisation which came into effect in March 2015, the canton consists of the following 14 communes:
 
Anais
Bouhet
Bourgneuf
Clavette
Croix-Chapeau
La Jarne
La Jarrie
Montroy
Saint-Christophe
Sainte-Soulle
Saint-Médard-d'Aunis
Saint-Rogatien
Thairé
Vérines

Population history

See also 
 Cantons of the Charente-Maritime department

References

External links
  The canton of La Jarrie on the INSEE site

Jarrie